The naval Battle of Dynekilen took place on 8 July 1716 during the Great Northern War between a Dano-Norwegian fleet under Peter Tordenskjold and a Swedish fleet under Olof Strömstierna. The battle resulted in a Dano-Norwegian victory.

Background
On 28 October 1709 Frederik IV of Denmark, the Danish-Norwegian king declared war against Sweden. The war declaration came after the Swedish defeat at the Battle of Poltava, which resulted in a decisive victory for Peter I of Russia over Charles XII of Sweden.

In the naval enactment, a light Danish-Norwegian force of 7 ships under Peter Tordenskjold trapped and defeated a Swedish transport fleet of 44 ships in Dynekilen fjord, just north of Strömstad, on the west coast of Sweden. The Swedish transport fleet was transporting troops, ammunition and supplies from Göteborg, destined for the land forces under the command of Charles XII invading Norway.

Battle
The Danish-Norwegian flotilla ambushed the Swedish fleet while it was positioned in the harbour of Dynekilen. In the process, it overcame and destroyed a small island fort equipped with six 12-pounder guns positioned in the harbour entrance. The largest Swedish ship, Stenbock, a former ship of the line converted into a cannon barge, surrendered, after which the lighter vessels were run aground, and an attempt made to destroy most of them. The Dano-Norwegian forces worked to put out fires and salvage as many of the ships as possible. They managed to save and capture 30 ships, while 14 ships, consisting of various galleys and transport ships, were successfully destroyed by the Swedish. Swedish land forces continued to fire muskets from the surrounding hills during these operations, eventually forcing Tordenskjold to leave, but not preventing him from taking with him all of 30 captured Swedish ships. The Dano-Norwegian force suffered 76 casualties, 19 killed and 57 wounded.

On account of the loss of this transport fleet at Dynekilen, Charles XII was forced to abandon the invasion of Norway and withdraw his troops to Sweden, where he was soon preoccupied with setting up defences against the expected combined Danish and Russian invasion force.

Ships involved

Denmark-Norway (Tordenskjold)

  47 (barge)
  30 (frigate)
  16 (frigate)
  7 (galley)
  7 (galley)
  7 (galley)

Sweden
 Stenbock 24 (barge) - Surrendered
 Proserpina 5 (galley) - Captured
 Ulysses 5 (galley) - Captured
 Lucretia 12 (galley) - Captured
 Wreden 21 (galley) - Sunk, later salvaged by the Swedes.
 Achilles 5 (half-galley) - Captured
 Pollux 5 (half-galley) - Captured
 Hector 5 (half-galley) -  destroyed.
 Castor 5 (half-galley) - Sunk, later salvaged by the Swedes
 Biorn 4 (double-sloop) - Captured
 Svarte Maeren 4 (double-sloop)  - Captured                                                               
 Schelpaden 12 (Gallioth) - Sunk, later salvaged by the Swedes
 TRANSPORTS - 5 captured, 3 destroyed

All according to Tordenskiolds own report. (printed at pages 229- 230, in the book, "Tordenskiolds Brev" (by Komandor, Olav Bergersen 1963)

Notes

Sources
Adamson, Hans Christian  Admiral Thunderbolt;: The spectacular career of Peter Wessel, Norway's greatest sea hero (Chilton Co., Book Division. 1959)
Andersson, R.C. Naval Wars in the Baltic 1522-1850 ( Francis Edwards Ltd. 1969) 
Bergersen, Olav "Tordenskiolds Brev" (Universitetsforlaget, Trondheim 1963)
Bjerg, Hans Christian Tordenskiold: Glimt af Wessel (Borgan. 1990) 
Christiansen, Per  Jeg vil synge om en helt: et biografisk skrift i anledning 300-arsjubileet for Peter Wessel Tordenskiolds fødsel (Ringve museum. 1990) 
Kavli, Guthorm I Tordenskjolds Kjølvann (Schibsted. 1990) 

Naval battles of the Great Northern War
Battles involving Norway
Conflicts in 1716
1716 in Denmark
History of Bohuslän
Battles involving Denmark